Crates of Tralles (Greek: Κράτης), an orator or rhetorician in the school of Isocrates.  David Ruhnken assigns to him the logoi dēmēgorikoi which Apollodorus of Athens ascribes to the Academic philosopher, Crates.  Gilles Ménage is wrong in supposing that Crates is mentioned by Lucian.  The person there spoken of is Critias the sculptor.

Notes

References

Ancient Greek rhetoricians
People from Tralles